The Atjeh Green Party (PAH), also known as the Aceh Greens, is a regional political party in Aceh, Indonesia, that was founded in 2013.

The Atjeh Greens is active and established in seven districts and cities. According to Fahmi Cherly, the party seeks to be registered by the 2024 election.

The Atjeh Greens have been supported by the Australian Greens as a part of the "Australian Political Parties for Democracy Program".

References

External links
 Aceh Greens on Facebook

2013 establishments in Indonesia
Political parties in Indonesia
Green political parties
Pancasila political parties